Davaka was a kingdom of ancient Indian subcontinent, located in current central region of Assam state.  The references to it comes from the 4th century Allahabad pillar inscription of Samudragupta, where it is mentioned as one of five frontier kingdoms of the Gupta Empire. 

Other references are the Shung-Shu History of the Liu Song dynasty, where the kingdom is named Kapili (now the name of a river); the Gachtal stone pillar inscription written in Kamrupi Prakrit. N. K. Bhattasali has identified it with Dabaka in modern Hojai district, with the kingdom associated with the Kopili-Kolong river valley.

Historians such as B. N. Puri (1968) and P. C. Choudhury (1959) claim that it was absorbed much earlier in the first half of the 5th century during the reign of Kalyana Varman (422–446).

Its capital was located near Kopili river. In the year 428 AD, an ambassador was sent to China by Davaka king, whose name according to Chinese sources is Yuegnai or Yu Chai.

Gatchal Stone Pillar inscription mention that the Yavana(Muslim) crossed the boundary to move east to reach Davaka in 1362 (saka 1284). A river (identified as Yamuna) that floods during  April-May helped naval forces to drive away enemies.

See also
 Dabaka
 Nagaon
 Dimasa Kingdom

References

Bibliography

 

Ancient empires and kingdoms of India
Kingdoms of Assam